The 1983 Israel Super Cup was the 13th Israel Super Cup (18th, including unofficial matches, as the competition wasn't played within the Israel Football Association in its first 5 editions, until 1969), an annual Israel football match played between the winners of the previous season's Top Division and Israel State Cup.

The match was played between Maccabi Netanya, champions of the 1982–83 Liga Leumit and Hapoel Tel Aviv, winners of the 1982–83 Israel State Cup.

This was Maccabi Netanya's 5th Israel Super Cup appearance and Hapoel Tel Aviv's 6th (including unofficial matches). At the match, played at Ramat Gan Stadium, Maccabi Netanya won 1–0.

Match details

References

1983
Super Cup
Super Cup 1983
Super Cup 1983
Israel Super Cup matches